Loving You More... In the Spirit of Etta James is the fourth studio album by American recording artist Leela James. It was released by Shanachie Records on July 31, 2012 in the United States.

Critical reception

Allmusic editor Andy Kellman found that "Loving You More is both reverent and imaginative. It's not just the range of the source material, which roams from the earliest part of Etta's career to the later years. It's also the boldness that comes with the number of drastic rearrangements, the most excellent of which is the transformation of the blues-gospel ballad "I'm Loving You More Every Day" into late-'70s/early-'80s-style soul-disco. The two originals – "Soul Will Never Die" and "Old School Kind of Love" – are sturdy enough to be mistaken for covers. Leela honors her hero and, yes, makes nine old songs her own. That's not easy to do."

Track listing
Credits adapted from the liner notes of Loving You More... In the Spirit of Etta James.

Charts

References

2012 albums
Etta James
Leela James albums
Tribute albums